The  was an infantry division of the Imperial Japanese Army. It was formed 28 February 1945 in Pyongyang as a square division. It was a part of the 16 simultaneously created divisions batch numbering from 140th to 160th.

Action
The 160th division was  assigned to 17th area army. 9 May 1945, the division was sent to North Jeolla Province to prepare a coastal defenses, performing uneventfully until surrender of Japan 15 August 1945. 461st infantry regiment was in Buan County, 462nd - in Gunsan, 463rd - in Seocheon County, and 464th infantry regiment - in Iksan.

See also
 List of Japanese Infantry Divisions

Notes and references
This article incorporates material from Japanese Wikipedia page 第160師団 (日本軍), accessed 14 July 2016
 Madej, W. Victor, Japanese Armed Forces Order of Battle, 1937–1945 [2 vols], Allentown, PA: 1981.

Japanese World War II divisions
Infantry divisions of Japan
Military units and formations established in 1945
Military units and formations disestablished in 1945
1945 establishments in Japan
1945 disestablishments in Japan